"Little Ol' Kisses" is a single by Canadian country music artist Julian Austin. Released in 1997, it was the first single from Austin's album What My Heart Already Knows. The song reached #1 on the RPM Country Tracks chart in July 1997.

Chart performance

Year-end charts

References

1997 singles
Julian Austin (musician) songs
Songs written by Julian Austin (musician)
1997 songs
ViK. Recordings singles